The Rhineland Cup (German: Rheinlandpokal) is one of the 21 regional cup competitions of German football. The winner of the competition gains entry to the first round of the German Cup. It is limited to clubs from the northern part of Rhineland-Palatinate, however, teams from the Bundesliga and 2. Bundesliga are not permitted to compete. It is one of two cup competitions in the state, the other being the South West Cup, which covers roughly the southern half of the state.

The competition is sponsored by the Bitburger brewery and carries the name Bitburger-Verbandspokal. In the past, it was sponsored by Oddset (Sports betting) and named Oddset-Pokal. It is operated by theRhineland Football Association, the Fußballverband Rheinland, or FVR.

The competition does not cover the whole of the historical region of Rhineland, only a part of it.

History
The Cup was established in 1953. The Rhineland Cup is played annually.

From 1974 onwards, the winner of the South West Cup qualified for the first round of the German Cup.

Since the establishment of the 3. Liga in 2008, reserve teams can not take part in the German Cup anymore, but are permitted to play in the regional competitions.

Modus
Clubs from fully professional leagues are not permitted to enter the competition, meaning, no teams from the Bundesliga and the 2. Bundesliga can compete. The fact that professional clubs were never permitted to compete in the competition accounts for the regions most successful club, Eintracht Trier, not taking out the cup until after it was relegated from professional football in 1973.

All clubs from the Rhineland playing in the 3. Liga (III), Regionalliga West (IV), Oberliga Südwest (V), Verbandsliga Rheinland (VI) and the three Bezirksligas (VII) gain direct entry to the first round. Additionally, the best teams out of the regional Kreis (District) cup competitions also qualify for the first round. The lower classed team always receives home advantage, except in the final, which is played on neutral ground.

Cup finals
Held annually at the end of season, these were the cup finals since 1954:

 Source: 
 Winners in bold
 1 TuS Mayen left the field at 4–4, Metternich declared the winner.

Winners
Listed in order of wins, the Cup winners are:

References

Sources
Deutschlands Fußball in Zahlen,  An annual publication with tables and results from the Bundesliga to Verbandsliga/Landesliga, publisher: DSFS

External links
Rhineland Football Association 
Fussball.de: Rhineland Cup 

Recurring sporting events established in 1953
Football cup competitions in Germany
Football competitions in Rhineland-Palatinate
1953 establishments in West Germany